Amorio is a village in the municipal unit of Orfeas, northeastern Evros, Greece. It is situated at 2 km from the right bank of the river Evros, that forms the border with Turkey here. Amorio is 6 km northeast of Lavara, 7 km southwest of Didymoteicho and 21 km west of Uzunköprü (Turkey). The Greek National Road 51/E85 (Alexandroupoli - Orestiada - Svilengrad) and the railway from Alexandroupoli to Didymoteicho pass through the village.

Historical population

History
After the Balkan Wars of 1912 and 1913, the area of Western Thrace became part of Bulgaria. As a result of the 1919 Treaty of Neuilly, it became a part of Greece. Amorio suffered damage from floods in 2005.

See also
List of settlements in the Evros regional unit

External links
 http://www.e-evros.gr/index.php?lang=en

References

Populated places in Evros (regional unit)
Orfeas